Gøran Søgard Johannessen (born 26 April 1994) is a Norwegian handball player for SG Flensburg-Handewitt and the Norwegian national team.

He participated at the 2019 World Men's Handball Championship.

References

External links

1994 births
Living people
Norwegian male handball players
Sportspeople from Stavanger
Norwegian expatriate sportspeople in Denmark
Norwegian expatriate sportspeople in Germany
Expatriate handball players
Handball-Bundesliga players
SG Flensburg-Handewitt players